Everest Re is a Bermuda-based provider of reinsurance and insurance, operating for close to 50 years through subsidiaries in the U.S., Europe, Singapore, Canada, Bermuda and other territories.

History 
In 1973, Everest Re Group was founded as Prudential Reinsurance, a subsidiary of Prudential Financial.  In the 1990s, Prudential Financial considered selling or spinning off Prudential Reinsurance.  On October 6, 1995, Prudential Reinsurance completed an IPO.  The chairman and CEO at that time was Joseph V. Taranto.  Prudential Reinsurance was renamed Everest Re in 1996, after Mount Everest.  In 2017, Everest Re became a S&P 500 component.

Business 
Everest offers property, casualty, and specialty products through its various operating affiliates located in key markets around the world.

Expanded history
 Early years as Prudential
 Founded in 1973
 Financial Services
 Reinsurance Arm
 1996 renaming to Everest Reinsurance

Business segments
 Reinsurance
 Insurance

References

External links 

Financial services companies established in 1973
Reinsurance companies
Companies listed on the New York Stock Exchange
Hamilton, Bermuda
Insurance companies of Bermuda